Rescueman, known in Japan as , is the fourth in the Time Bokan series. Burning with ambitions to become the most beautiful woman, the most renowned scientist, and the greatest hero the world has ever known, three villains - Atasha, Sekobitchi, and Duwarusuki - join forces. The trio appear as Time Patrollers, the keepers and protectors of the annals of history. But this is only a cover for the trio, as the villains are in league with a nefarious leader, who is trying to alter the course of history to suit his desires. Under the instructions of their leader, the trio travel in time with the aim of tampering with recorded history. Only Hikaru and Nana, disguised as the Rescuemen, stand between the villains and their goals.

Cast

Hikaru - Yū Mizushima
Nana - Saeko Shimazu

Endangerman
Atasha - Noriko Ohara
Sekobicchi - Jōji Yanami
Dowalsuki - Kazuya Tatekabe
Gekigasuki - Masayuki Yamamoto

Others
Chief Tonnan - Junpei Takiguchi
Official Onuki - Yoshito Miyamura→Ikuo Nishikawa→Satoru Itagaki
Doctor Sasayabu - Kei Tomiyama
Athletic Chief Miyamoto - Yoshito Miyamura
Tonman Manteau - Masaru Ikeda
Narrator - Kei Tomiyama

Episodes

References

External links
タイムパトロール隊 オタスケマン｜タイムボカンシリーズDVDコレクション
 

1980 anime television series debuts
Fuji TV original programming
Science fiction anime and manga
Tatsunoko Production
Time Bokan Series
Japanese time travel television series